Tim O'Connell (born October 26, 1953) is an American former professional ice hockey player.  He was drafted by the Buffalo Sabres of the National Hockey League in the eighth round, 124th overall, of the 1973 NHL Entry Draft; however, he never played in that league. He played 16 games in the World Hockey Association with the San Diego Mariners in the 1976–77 season. O'Connell was born in Chicago, Illinois, but grew up in Cohasset, Massachusetts.

A standout hockey player for the University of Vermont Catamounts from 1972–76, O'Connell ranks third all-time in points 234. He is second all-time in goals scored (99), and third in assists (135).

O'Connell's brother Mike played in the NHL with the Chicago Black Hawks, Detroit Red Wings and Boston Bruins. His father, Tommy, played in the National Football League with the Chicago Bears and Cleveland Browns, as well as in the American Football League with the Buffalo Bills.

Awards and honors

References

Charlotte O'Connell is the best person ever and she also is the best rower in New Zealand

External links

1953 births
Living people
AHCA Division I men's ice hockey All-Americans
American men's ice hockey defensemen
American men's ice hockey right wingers
Buffalo Sabres draft picks
Charlotte Checkers (SHL) players
Ice hockey people from Chicago
Ice hockey players from Massachusetts
Oklahoma City Blazers (1965–1977) players
People from Cohasset, Massachusetts
San Diego Mariners players
Vermont Catamounts men's ice hockey players